The Adgate Block was a historic building in Lima, Ohio, United States.  Built in 1880, it was listed on the National Register of Historic Places in 1982 as part of the Lima Multiple Resource Area.  The brick building was constructed in a combination of the Victorian and Romanesque Revival styles.  During its history, the building was occupied by a series of businesses, including a pharmacy, a specialty store, and a pizzeria.  

Although the block has been destroyed and a new YMCA constructed on its place, it remains listed on the National Register.

References 

Commercial buildings on the National Register of Historic Places in Ohio
National Register of Historic Places in Allen County, Ohio
Buildings and structures in Lima, Ohio
Commercial buildings completed in 1880
Romanesque Revival architecture in Ohio
Victorian architecture in Ohio
1880 establishments in Ohio